Stanimir Milošković (born 21 December 1983) is a Serbian professional footballer who plays as a striker for Maltese club Żebbuġ Rangers.

Career
Born in Kragujevac, Milošković played for his hometown clubs Radnički and Šumadija, before moving abroad to Greece and joining Beta Ethniki side Kalamata in the summer of 2005. He spent three seasons at the club, scoring 15 goals in 85 league appearances. In the summer of 2008, Milošković moved to fellow Greek side Pierikos, spending the following year and a half with them. He returned to his parent club Radnički Kragujevac in the 2010 winter transfer window, helping the side win promotion to the Serbian First League. Subsequently, Milošković went back to Greece and spent a season with Pierikos.

In July 2011, Milošković signed with newly promoted Serbian SuperLiga side Radnički Kragujevac. He spent the next two seasons there, making 55 appearances and scoring nine goals in the top flight.

In 2017, Milošković played for Ängelholms FF in the Swedish Division 1.

In 2018, Milošković moved to Malta and played for Gozo Football League First Division club Nadur Youngsters.

In 2018–19, Milošković played for Gozo Football League First Division club Victoria Hotspurs.

Honours
Radnički Kragujevac
 Serbian League West: 2009–10

External links
 
 
 

Ängelholms FF players
Association football forwards
Birkirkara F.C. players
Diagoras F.C. players
Expatriate footballers in Greece
Expatriate footballers in Malta
Expatriate footballers in Sweden
FK Jagodina players
FK Javor Ivanjica players
FK Kolubara players
FK Radnički 1923 players
FK Sloga Petrovac na Mlavi players
Kalamata F.C. players
Nadur Youngsters F.C. players
Pierikos F.C. players
Serbian expatriate footballers
Serbian expatriate sportspeople in Greece
Serbian expatriate sportspeople in Malta
Serbian expatriate sportspeople in Sweden
Serbian First League players
Serbian footballers
Serbian SuperLiga players
Sportspeople from Kragujevac
Victoria Hotspurs F.C. players
1983 births
Living people